Paleoconservatism is a political philosophy and strain of conservatism in the United States stressing American nationalism, Christian ethics, regionalism, and traditionalist conservatism. Paleoconservatism's concerns overlap with those of the Old Right that opposed the New Deal in the 1930s and 1940s as well as with paleolibertarianism and right-wing populism.

The terms neoconservative and paleoconservative were coined following the outbreak of the Vietnam War and a divide in American conservatism between the interventionists and the isolationists. Those in favor of the Vietnam War then became known as the neoconservatives (interventionists), as they marked a decisive split from the nationalist-isolationism that the traditionalist conservatives (isolationists) had subscribed to up until this point.

According to international relations scholar Michael Foley, "paleoconservatives press for restrictions on immigration, a rollback of multicultural programs and large-scale demographic change, the decentralization of federal policy, the restoration of controls upon free trade, a greater emphasis upon economic nationalism and non-interventionism in the conduct of American foreign policy". Historian George Hawley states that although influenced by paleoconservatism, Donald Trump is not a paleoconservative, but rather a right-wing nationalist and populist. Hawley also states that paleoconservatism is today an exhausted force in American politics, but that for a time it represented the most serious right-wing threat to the mainstream conservative movement.  Regardless of how Trump himself is categorized, others regard the movement known as Trumpism as supported by, if not a rebranding of, paleoconservatism.  From this view, the followers of the old right did not fade away so easily and continue to have significant influence in the Republican Party and the entire country.

Terminology 
The prefix paleo derives from the Greek root παλαιός (palaiós), meaning "ancient" or "old". It is somewhat tongue-in-cheek and refers to the paleoconservatives' claim to represent a more historic, authentic conservative tradition than that found in neoconservatism. Adherents of paleoconservatism often describe themselves simply as "paleo". Rich Lowry of National Review claims the prefix "is designed to obscure the fact that it is a recent ideological creation of post-Cold War politics".

Samuel T. Francis, Thomas Fleming, and some other paleoconservatives de-emphasized the conservative part of the paleoconservative label, saying that they do not want the status quo preserved. Fleming and Paul Gottfried called such thinking "stupid tenacity" and described it as "a series of trenches dug in defense of last year's revolution". Francis defined authentic conservatism as "the survival and enhancement of a particular people and its institutionalized cultural expressions".

Ideology 
Paleoconservatives support restrictions on immigration, decentralization, trade tariffs and protectionism, economic nationalism, isolationism, and a return to traditional conservative ideals relating to gender, culture, and society.

Paleoconservatism differs from neoconservatism in opposing free trade and promoting republicanism. Paleoconservatives see neoconservatives as imperialists and themselves as defenders of the republic.

Paleoconservatives tend to oppose abortion, gay marriage, and LGBTQ rights.

Human nature, tradition, and reason 
Paleoconservatives believe that tradition is a form of reason, rather than a competing force. Mel Bradford wrote that certain questions are settled before any serious deliberation concerning a preferred course of conduct may begin. This ethic is based in a "culture of families, linked by friendship, common enemies, and common projects", so a good conservative keeps "a clear sense of what Southern grandmothers have always meant in admonishing children, 'we don't do that'".

Pat Buchanan argues that a good politician must "defend the moral order rooted in the old and New Testament and Natural Law"—and that "the deepest problems in our society are not economic or political, but moral".

Southern traditionalism 
According to historian Paul V. Murphy, paleoconservatives developed a focus on localism and states' rights. From the mid-1980s onward, Chronicles  promoted a Southern traditionalist worldview focused on national identity, regional particularity, and skepticism of abstract theory and centralized power. According to Hague, Beirich, and Sebesta (2009), the antimodernism of the paleoconservative movement defined the neo-Confederate movement of the 1980s and 1990s. During this time, notable paleoconservatives argued that desegregation, welfare, tolerance of gay rights, and church-state separation had been damaging to local communities, and that these issues had been imposed by federal legislation and think tanks. Paleoconservatives also claimed the Southern Agrarians as forebearers in this regard.

Influence on the alt-right 
The alt-right movement emerged from the younger generation of paleoconservatives. The movement was founded in 2008 by noted neo-Nazi, former paleoconservative, and American white nationalist Richard B. Spencer, who launched Alternative Right to disseminate his ideas after working as an editor for several paleoconservative outlets. The alt-right was influenced by paleoconservatism, the Dark Enlightenment, and the Nouvelle Droite.

Notable people

Philosophers and scholars 
 Mel Bradford (1934–1993)
 Paul Gottfried (born 1941)
 E. Christian Kopff (born 1946)
 William S. Lind (born 1947)
 Clyde N. Wilson (born 1941)

Commentators and columnists 
 Pat Buchanan (born 1938), White House Communications Director (1985–1987), 1992 and 1996 Republican presidential candidate, 2000 Reform Party presidential nominee
 Peter Brimelow (born 1947)
 Tucker Carlson (born 1969)
 John Derbyshire (born 1945)
 Nick Fuentes (born 1998)
 Thomas Fleming (born 1945)
 Samuel T. Francis (1947–2005)
 Alex Jones (born 1974)
 Razib Khan (born 1977)
 Robert Novak (1931–2009)
 Steve Sailer (born 1958)
 Joseph Sobran (1946–2010)
 Taki Theodoracopulos (born 1936)

Notable organizations and outlets

Organizations 

 Abbeville Institute
 John Birch Society

Periodicals and websites 
 The American Conservative
 Chronicles (magazine)
 Intercollegiate Review
 Taki's Magazine

See also

References

Bibliography

External links
 

Paleoconservatism
American nationalism
Anti-communism in the United States
Reactionary
Criticism of neoconservatism
Criticism of multiculturalism
Non-interventionism
Right-wing populism